Buchenavia hoehneana is a species of plant in the Combretaceae family. It is endemic to Brazil, found only in a few localities of the Atlantic Forest. It is threatened by habitat loss.

Taxonomy 
Buchenavia hoehneana was described by Nilza Fischer de Mattos in 1967 and published in Loefgrenia; Communicações avulsas de botânica.

References

Flora of Brazil
hoehneana
Vulnerable plants
Taxonomy articles created by Polbot
Taxobox binomials not recognized by IUCN